Dowth is a Neolithic passage tomb located in the Boyne Valley, County Meath, Ireland. It is one of the three principal tombs of the Brú na Bóinne  World Heritage Sitea landscape of prehistoric monuments including the large passage-tombs of Dowth, Dowth Hall, Newgrange and Knowth. Unlike Newgrange and Knowth, Dowth has not been independently dated, but its features align it with the other passage tombs which date from between approximately 3200 and 2900 BC. However, Harbison (1970) dates the tomb at  25002000 BC.  It is less developed as a tourist attraction than its neighbours, partly because the chamber is much lower, and partly because the decoration is less visible. It was partly excavated, in 1847 by the Royal Irish Academy who dynamited the roof causing the still visible crater, though it was pillaged by Vikings and earlier looters long before that.

Archaeological and geophysical field surveys of the entire site, including later monuments, were carried out episodically from 2012-2015. In July 2018, another passage tomb in the grounds of nearby Dowth Hall was excavated, revealing significant examples of Neolithic rock art similar to those at Dowth and the other Brú na Bóinne sites.

Description
Quartz was found fallen outside the kerbing, suggesting that the entrance to this tomb was surrounding by glittering white, as at Newgrange. Three stone-lined passages lead into the mound from the west. These are two passage tombs (known as Dowth North and Dowth South) and a souterrain.

The longest of the passages (Dowth North) is 18.2 metres in length and is crossed by 3 sill-stones and ends in a cruciform chamber with a lintelled (not corbelled as in Newgrange or Knowth) roof. Dowth South is 3.5 metres long and ends in a roughly circular chamber with a modern concrete roof (the original roof having collapsed). In Dowth North, several of the orthostats (upright stones) of the passage and chamber are decorated with spirals, chevrons, lozenges and rayed circles. On the floor stands a single stone basin, 1.4m x 1m in size. The right-hand arm of the cross leads into another long rectangular chamber with an L-shaped extension entered over a low sill, sometimes referred to as 'the annex'. This may be the earliest part of the tomb, later brought within the design of the cruciform tomb. This annex is floored with a 2.4 metre-long flagstone containing an oval bullaun (artificial depression). Until recently the cruciform tomb was reached by climbing down a ladder in an iron cage, and crawling about over loose stones. Now, access is restricted, and all the features are guarded by metal grilles.

A kerbstone with cup-marks, a spiral and a flower-like design marks the entrance to Dowth South. While the current roof is modern, it is possible the original one was corbelled, as at Newgrange. This tomb has a few decorated stones, and a large right-hand recess.

The third entrance visible on the west side of Dowth is an early Christian souterrain. It leads into the passage of Dowth North and was constructed around the 10th or 11th century CE. The Annals of Ulster and the Annals of the Four Masters refer to Norsemen plundering the "cave‟ of Dowth around 862 CE; the "cave" in this description may refer to the souterrain.

The mound originally had about 115 kerbstones surrounding it. Kerbstone 51, sometimes called the Stone of the Seven Suns, features a number of radial circular carvings, similar to those at Loughcrew.

The mound was extensively excavated in the 19th century, and the crater caused by digging appears not to have been filled in, leading to its being subsequently used for stone quarrying.

Astronomical alignment
Dowth shares a special solar celebration with neighbouring Newgrange during the winter solstice. Martin Brennan, author of The Stars and the Stones: Ancient Art and Astronomy in Ireland - Thames and Hudson 1983, discovered the remarkable alignment during the course of his ten-year study in the Boyne Valley.  From November to February the rays of the evening sun reach into the passage and then the chamber of Dowth South. During the winter solstice the light of the low sun moves along the left side of the passage, then into the circular chamber, where three stones are lit up by the sun.

The convex central stone reflects the sunlight in to a dark recess, lighting up the decorated stones there. The rays then recede slowly along the right side of the passage and after about two hours the sun withdraws from Dowth South.

Myth
The medieval Dindsenchas (lore of places) has a story about Dowth (Dubhadh). It says that king Bresal Bó-Díbad compelled the men of Ireland to build a tower to heaven within a day. His sister cast a spell, making the sun stand still so that one day lasted indefinitely. However, Bresal then commits incest with his sister, which breaks the spell. The sun sets and the builders leave, hence the name Dubhadh ('darkening'). This tale has been linked with solstice alignments at Brú na Bóinne. It has also been linked with recent DNA analysis, which found that a man buried at nearby Newgrange had parents who were most likely siblings. This could mean that knowledge of the events survived for thousands of years before being recorded as a myth in the Middle Ages.

References

External links

Official website
Meath Tourism Information on Dowth
Brú na Bóinne in myth and folklore 

4th-millennium BC architecture
Archaeological sites in County Meath
Brú na Bóinne
Prehistoric sites in Ireland
Tourist attractions in County Meath
Boyne culture
Tombs in the Republic of Ireland